NCAA March Madness 99 is the 1998 installment in the NCAA March Madness series. Former North Carolina player Antawn Jamison is featured on the cover.

Reception

The game received mixed reviews according to the review aggregation website GameRankings.

See also
NBA Live 99

References

External links
 

1998 video games
Basketball video games
EA Sports games
NCAA video games
North America-exclusive video games
PlayStation (console) games
PlayStation (console)-only games
Video games developed in the United States